The 2022 WDF Europe Cup Youth was be the 31st edition of the WDF Europe Cup Youth organised by the World Darts Federation. The tournament will be held at the Budapesti Honvéd Sportegyesület in Budapest, Hungary. Due to the cancellation of tournaments in 2020–2021 because the COVID-19 pandemic, it was decided to organize an additional tournament (WDF Europe U21 Cup) for players under 21 years of age. Medals were distributed in twelve disciplines (singles, pairs and overalls) appropriately for each of the sex and cups and also two boys tournaments for every cups.

Medal tally

Qualifiers
19 countries/associations entered a team in the event. Not all teams took part in all events.

Draw for U18

Boys singles

Girls singles

Boys pairs

Girls pairs

Boys teams

Draw for U21

Boys singles

Girls singles

Overall champions

References

WDF Europe Cup Youth
WDF Europe Cup Youth
WDF Europe Cup Youth